The 1945 Cleveland Rams season was the team's eighth year with the National Football League and the ninth and final season in Cleveland. Led by the brother tandem of head coach Adam Walsh and general manager Chile Walsh, and helmed by future Hall of Fame quarterback Bob Waterfield, the Rams franchise finished 9–1 before winning its first NFL Championship by defeating the Washington Redskins, 15–14, at Cleveland Stadium. Other stars on the team included receiver Jim Benton and back Jim Gillette, who gained more than 100 yards in the title game.

One month after winning the NFL Championship, franchise owner Dan Reeves, who had sustained five years of heavy financial losses (even during the team's championship season) because of poor home crowds, realized he had no prospect of the Rams competing in Cleveland with the AAFC's Browns, who were to commence play the next year, and relocated the Rams to Los Angeles. The Rams' move to Los Angeles marked the first of only two occasions that a professional football champion has played the following season in another city.

Off season

NFL Draft

Schedule

Standings

Regular season

Week 2: vs. Chicago Cardinals

Week 3: vs. Chicago Bears

Week 4: at Green Bay Packers

at East Stadium, Green Bay, Wisconsin
 Game attendance: 24,607

CLE – Benton 17 pass from Waterfield (kick failed)
GB – Comp 1 run (Hutson kick)
GB – Fritsch 3 run (Hutson kick)
CLE – Colella 6 pass from Waterfield (Waterfield kick)
CLE – Greenwood 1 run (Waterfield kick)
CLE – Colella 5 run (Waterfield kick)

Week 5: at Chicago Bears

at Wrigley Field, Chicago, Illinois
 Game attendance: 28,273

CLE – Greenwood 11 run (kick failed)
CLE – Colella 3 run (Waterfield kick)
CLE – Gehrke 10 run (Waterfield kick)
CHI – Margarita 1 run (Gudauskas kick)
CHI – Margarita 42 pass from Luckman (Gudauskas kick)
CHI – Gallameau 2 run (Gudauskas kick)
CLE – Greenwood 8 run (Waterfield kick)
CLE – Benton 21 pass from Waterfield (Waterfield kick)
CLE – Colella 18 pass from Reisz (Waterfield kick)

Week 6: at Philadelphia Eagles

Week 7: at New York Giants

Week 8: vs. Green Bay Packers

Week 9: at Chicago Cardinals

Week 10: at Detroit Lions

Week 11: vs. Boston Yanks

Post season

NFL Championship Game: vs. Washington Redskins

In the first quarter, the Redskins had the ball at their own 5-yard line. Dropping back into the end zone, quarterback Sammy Baugh threw, but the ball hit the goal post (which at the time was on the goal line instead of at the back of the end zone) and bounced back to the ground in the end zone. Under the rules at the time, this was ruled as a safety and thus gave the Rams a 2–0 lead.

In the second quarter, Baugh suffered bruised ribs and was replaced by Frank Filchock. Filchock threw a 38-yard touchdown pass to Steve Bagarus to give the Redskins a 7–2 lead. But the Rams scored just before halftime when rookie quarterback Bob Waterfield threw a 37-yard touchdown pass to Jim Benton. Waterfield's ensuing extra point was partially blocked, with the ball teetering on the crossbar, but it dropped over to give Cleveland a 9–7 lead.

In the third quarter, the Rams increased their lead when Jim Gillette scored on a 44-yard touchdown reception, but this time the extra point was missed. The Redskins then came back to cut their deficit to 15–14 with Bob Seymour's 8-yard touchdown catch from Filchock. In the fourth quarter, Washington kicker Joe Aguirre missed two field goals attempts, of 46 and 31 yards, that could have won the game.

Roster
Bold denotes player on the official NFL roster at the end of the 1945 season.

Awards and records
 Adam Walsh, Coach of the Year
 Bob Waterfield, League Most Valuable Player
 Bob Waterfield, NFL leader, Touchdowns (14 – tied)

Footnotes

External links

Cleveland Rams
Cleveland Rams seasons
National Football League championship seasons
Cleveland Rams